Rebekah Higgs (born May 19, 1982) is a Canadian indie rock singer, songwriter from Halifax, Nova Scotia.

In 2017 Rebekah founded Matriarch productions   a production company that produces the TV show DIY MOM. Rebekah is the designer and star of the Canadian TV show, that showcases renovation and decor ideas on a single mom budget.

Career
She released her debut self-titled album in September 2006, recorded in Toronto with producer Thomas Payne of the Canadian band Joydrop. The album was written and performed entirely by Higgs and Thomas and is a fusion of shoegaze, folk and pop. In 2007, Higgs released her album on Outside Music and was nominated for the 2008 East Coast Music Awards, as best female solo recording and best new artist.

Higgs has performed at many festivals including, SXSW, NXNE, CMJ, the Great Escape, Sled Island, the Winnipeg Folk Festival, Pop Montreal, Summer Sonic and toured Canada frequently from 2006-2012 with guitarist Jason Vautour, bassist Sean MacGillivray, and keyboardist Colin Crowell. All four musicians also perform in the dance pop group Ruby Jean and the Thoughtful Bees. They released an electronic dance album in 2009, touring the Uk and Canada opening Dragonnette, and performing at Toronto Pride Festival in 2010 on the same bill as Cyndi Lauper.  

In 2011 Rebekah released her second studio album “Odd Fellowship” on Hidden pony records (EMI). The album was produced by Modest Mouse producer Brian  Deck.

Rebekah's daughter Lennon Higgs, was born in 2013 and after becoming a single Mother, Rebekah moved home to Halifax, Nova Scotia and changed careers to work in film in television. Her love for home, decor and inspiring others to make it happen, led her to share her passion on camera under the name DIY MOM.

In 2014 Rebekah started sharing decor and design tips as DIY MOM on YouTube.  DIY MOM became a TV show on bell TV on demand in 2017. She completed 5 seasons of her show with the network, one Christmas special and 2 backyard specials. She is the owner of Matriarch Productions and produces her own content about renovating and designing as a single mom.

She frequently posts and creates new content for her Instagram page @diymom.ca. Her home designs have been photographed and featured in Chatelaine, Forbes, HGTV magazine, Style at Home, East Coast Living, and the Coast.

Discography
Road To Eden (2005)
Rebekah Higgs (2006)
Ruby Jean and the Thoughtful Bees (2009)
“From The Back Of The Film” Songs for the Gang: Thrush Hermit tribute. (2010)
Little Voice (2010)
Little Voice Remix (2011)
Odd Fellowship (2011)
"Rebel Rebel" (2013)
"Sha La La" (2013)

References

https://diymom.ca/diy-who

Canadian folk singer-songwriters
Canadian women singer-songwriters
Living people
1982 births
Musicians from Halifax, Nova Scotia
Canadian women pop singers
21st-century Canadian women singers